Sagaropsis is a genus of tiger moths in the family Erebidae.

Species
Sagaropsis centralis Hering, 1925
Sagaropsis brevifasciata Hering, 1925
Sagaropsis elegans Hering, 1925
Sagaropsis horae (Druce, 1885)
Sagaropsis monotona Hering, 1925
Sagaropsis rhombifera (Dognin, 1920)
Sagaropsis tolimata (Dognin, 1918)

References

Natural History Museum Lepidoptera generic names catalog

Pericopina
Glossata genera